Raymond James Boland (February 8, 1932 – February 27, 2014) was an Irish-born prelate of the Roman Catholic Church.  He served as the second bishop of the Diocese of Birmingham in Alabama from 1988 to 1993 and the fifth Bishop of the Diocese of Kansas City-Saint Joseph in Missouri from 1993 to 2005.

Biography

Early life 
Raymond Boland was born in Cork County, Ireland, on February 8, 1932.  He received his early education from the Christian Brothers in Cork. He trained at All Hallows College (Dublin) as a missionary priest, while also taking a degree at University College Dublin.

Boland was ordained to the priesthood by Bishop Denis J. Moynihan on June 16, 1957, for the Archdiocese of Washington. Boland was the pastor of Saint Hugh of Grenoble Parish in Greenbelt, Maryland, from 1970 to 1973.

Bishop of Birmingham 
Boland was appointed bishop of the Diocese of Birmingham on February 2, 1988, by Pope John Paul II.  He was consecrated on March 25, 1988, by Archbishop Oscar Lipscomb.

Bishop of Kansas City-Saint Joseph 
Boland was appointed bishop of the Diocese of Kansas City-Saint Joseph on June 22, 1993, by John Paul II.

The Vatican accepted Boland's request for retirement as bishop of Kansas City-Saint Joseph on May 24, 2005. Boland died on February 27, 2014, in Cork, Ireland. One of his brothers, John Kevin Boland, was the Bishop of Savannah, Georgia.

References

Episcopal succession

1932 births
2014 deaths
20th-century Roman Catholic bishops in the United States
21st-century Roman Catholic bishops in the United States
Alumni of All Hallows College, Dublin
Alumni of University College Dublin
American Roman Catholic clergy of Irish descent
Irish emigrants to the United States
People from County Tipperary
Roman Catholic bishops of Kansas City–Saint Joseph
Roman Catholic Diocese of Birmingham in Alabama
Bishops in Alabama